Spring Mill Village is an unincorporated community in Marion Township, Lawrence County, Indiana.

History
A post office was established as Spring Mill in 1831, and remained in operation until it was discontinued in 1859. The community was named from the presence of a water-powered gristmill.

Geography

References

Unincorporated communities in Lawrence County, Indiana
Unincorporated communities in Indiana